The Andorra Hustle is a 2020 documentary film about the war of the Kingdom of Spain against the Catalan independence movement. The documentary was produced between March 2019 and August 2020 and premiered on August 27, 2020 via the Amazon Prime platform.

Reception
On Rotten Tomatoes, the film holds an approval rating of 86% based on 7 reviews, with an average rating of 7.20/10.

See also 
 Operation Catalonia

References

External links 
 
 

2020 films
2020 documentary films
American documentary films
2020s English-language films
2020s American films